Šuja is a village municipality in Žilina District in the Žilina Region of northern Slovakia.

History
The village was first mentioned in 1393.

Geography
It has a population of about 318 people.

References

External links
http://www.statistics.sk/mosmis/eng/run.html

Villages and municipalities in Žilina District